Lazar Kovačević (born 4 November 1997) is a Serbian sports shooter. He won European Junior Championships silver medal in 2017 in Maribor and finished in fourth place in 10m air rifle at the 2018 Mediterranean Games in Tarragona.

Kovačević won two silver medals as part of the Serbian team at 2019 European 10 m Events Championships and 2021 European Shooting Championships, respectively, as well as a bronze medal at the 2021 World Cup in Osijek.

References

1997 births
Living people
Serbian male sport shooters
European Games competitors for Serbia
People from Jagodina
Shooters at the 2019 European Games
20th-century Serbian people
21st-century Serbian people
Mediterranean Games competitors for Serbia
Competitors at the 2022 Mediterranean Games